Mary, Mediatrix of All Grace is a Marian apparition that allegedly took place in the Carmelite Monastery of Lipa, Batangas, Philippines, to a former Carmelite postulant, Teresita Castillo. The original statue associated with the apparition is currently enshrined at the monastery.

Initially declared as "non-supernatural" after an investigation by six Filipino bishops headed by Cardinal Rufino Santos on 11 April 1951, the case was reopened in 1991 by the local bishop. On 12 September 2015, the Archbishop of Lipa Ramón Argüelles, against explicit direction from the Holy See and the Bishops' Conference of the Philippines, formally approved the apparitions, declaring them "supernatural in character and worthy of belief." In response, the Congregation of the Doctrine of the Faith, on 11 December 2015, declared the apparition non-supernatural. The Archbishop of Lipa received the official copy of the final verdict on May 31. On 1 June 2016, Archbishop Arguelles released a public statement retracting his episcopal judgment on the controversial matter, reverting to the decision issued by the Holy See.

Name 
The Blessed Virgin Mary is honored under the title Mediatrix of all graces. It has its origins in Belgium where devotion under this title began, and the same Marian title was consecrated by Catholic bishops in China from 1946. The title given at Lipa was "Mediatrix of All Grace". In Lipa, it is singular and upper case, meaning - a proper noun. Sr. Teresita has confirmed that "All-Grace" refers to Jesus or God (whom we refer too, as "All Holy," "Almighty," "All Knowing").

The 1948 apparitions in Carmel, Lipa 

On August 18, 1948, Teresita Castillo—then a postulant at the monastery—noticed a heavenly odour, and upon entering her room saw a beautiful lady in white who spoke to her: "Do not fear my daughter, He who loves above all things has sent me. I come with a message…" The lady asked Castillo to wash and kiss the feet of her prioress, and drink the used water afterwards. The lady said that the washing was a "sign of humility and obedience".

According to the account, on September 12, 1948, Castillo was in the convent garden and noticed a vine shaking without any wind blowing. She then heard a woman's voice that instructed her to visit the garden for 15 consecutive days. The next day, September 13, Castillo came to the spot at 5:00 p.m., knelt down and intended to say the Hail Mary. In the middle of the prayer, wind came, the garden vine moved, and a beautiful lady appeared. Castillo described the lady as having her hands clasped in prayer and holding a golden rosary in her right hand. The lady asked her to pray for priests and nuns.

On September 14, rose petals began to shower within the monastery, and some of the nuns noticed rose petals outside their hallways. Again at 5:00 p.m., the lady appeared once more at the vine and said "I wish this place to be blessed tomorrow." "At what time, Mother," asked Castillo. "Anytime your Mother Prioress wants, my child. I forbid you to forget the incidents of these fifteen days." Then the lady vanished.

The prioress, Mary Cecilia of Jesus, decided to consult with Alfredo Obviar, Auxiliary Bishop of Lipa and spiritual director of the nuns. The bishop instructed the prioress to demand proof from the lady that she is from heaven.

Days after the first shower of rose petals, total blindness affected Castillo. Mary Cecilia of Jesus then heard a woman's voice telling her to kiss the postulant's eyes so that the latter will recover her sight. In the presence of Obviar, the prioress lifted Castillo's veil and kissed the postulant's eyes. Immediately, the girl recovered her sight, and Obviar no longer doubted the apparitions.

Description of the apparition 
According to Teresita Castillo, the Virgin Mary was slightly stooped and dressed in white, with a narrow cloth belt about her waist. Her face was radiant, and her statues often show her dark hair flowing down her back beneath a white veil. Her hands are clasped on her breast, and a golden rosary hangs from her right hand. She is shown barefoot on clouds about two feet above the ground.

Later events 
According to a later interview with the prioress, Mother Mary of the Sacred Heart and Sister Mary Balthazar were ordered to burn several boxes containing leaflets, novena booklets, rose petals, and other paraphernalia pertaining to the apparition, including Castillo's personal diary. The sisters were also ordered by the bishop to throw the image of the Virgin into a bonfire, but they instead hid it out of piety.

Castillo herself in an interview said she had met the Apostolic Nuncio to the Philippines Cardinal Egidio Vagnozzi in 1951, and told him that she had already left the monastery to seek medical treatment. Vagnozzi strongly disapproved, called Castillo the Devil, and asked her to leave his presence, even trying to shove her out the door. Castillo burst into tears and begged for his blessing, which he withheld.

The current archbishop of Lipa, Ramón Argüelles, noted that auxiliary bishop Obviar and Bishop of Lipa Verzosa, who were on the commission, were forced to leave the investigation due to their lack of jurisdiction over Lipa. In a televised interview with ABS-CBN, Argüelles said no documents were compiled or even reached the Holy See in 1951, causing its immediate rejection. In 1991, a petition to approve the apparition began once again.

Ecclesiastical investigation, canonical approval and reversal by the Vatican 

An initial investigation report in 1951 was signed by six Roman Catholic bishops and declared the Lipa apparitions a hoax and "non-supernatural". One bishop later recanted on his deathbed, and a second investigation was opened in 1991.

On 21 May 1990, then-Lipa Archbishop Mariano G. Gaviola, allowed the venerated image of Our Lady to be exposed again, after 40 years of being banned from the public. Devotion was rekindled and devotees increase to this day.
 
On 17 April 2005, Argüelles issued a circular, stating that he found no objection to the devotion under this Marian title. The Archdiocese of Lipa currently endorses Marian devotion to this title, which is not expressly prohibited as long as it does not counter church doctrine. In Batangas province, local bishops often tolerate the devotion, which has drawn adherents including Filipino celebrities and politicians.

On 3 March 2011, Pope Benedict XVI was presented with a statue of the apparition by Bishop Guillermo Afable during the Catholic Bishops' Conference of the Philippines Ad Limina visit. On 9 March 2011, a life-sized statue brought by Filipino bishops was publicly displayed in the general Wednesday papal audience at Pope Paul VI Audience Hall.

On 12 September 2015, Argüelles formally released the canonical results of the investigation launched by the archdiocese, declaring the Marian apparitions to be "supernatural in character and worthy of pious belief". At present, a postulate for Canonical Coronation is pending submission to Pope Francis for pontifical approbation.

However, in May 2016, the Sacred Congregation of the Doctrine of the Faith (CDF) under Cardinal Gerhard Mueller overruled the archbishop and rejected his 2012 decree declaring that the alleged Marian apparitions in Batangas in 1948 were authentic. Arguelles himself disclosed the ruling by the CDF in an archdiocesan communiqué on May 31. In its decree, the Congregation stated that Pope Pius XII had made a definitive confirmation in 1951 against the supposed apparitions declaring that they "were not of supernatural origin," which the local authority had no authority to overrule.

Veneration 

President Gloria Macapagal Arroyo, a frequent visitor to the convent, on the Feast of the Assumption in 2007 signed Proclamation № 1362, declaring every 12 September a "National Day of Prayer for Peace and Reconciliation" in honor of the Lipa apparitions.

Former Philippine Ambassador to the Holy See, Mercedes Arrastia Tuason, is a devotee of the apparitions, and displays a large statue of Our Lady Mediatrix of All Grace in her consular office in Rome. Emma de Guzman, purported visionary, stigmatist and foundress of the church-sanctioned "La Pietà" International Prayer Group, said that Mary had declared herself to be "the Mediatrix standing in front of the Mediator".

During his visit to Tacloban on 17 January 2015, Pope Francis venerated a replica of the image at the residence of the Archbishop of Palo.

On 1 June 2015, a replica of the image was venerated and processed in the Church of Saint Catherine adjoining the Church of the Nativity in Bethlehem, and was attended by the Custos of the Holy Land, Pierbattista Pizzaballa, OFM.

References

Catholic Mariology
Titles of Mary
Mediatrix of All Graces
Catholic Church in the Philippines
Religion in Batangas
Lipa, Batangas

pt:Nossa Senhora Medianeira
tl:Birhen ng Mediatrix ng lahat ng Grasya